The Cairo Agreement, or Cairo Accord, was an agreement reached on 2 November 1969 during talks between Yassir Arafat and the Lebanese army commander, General Emile Bustani. Egyptian President Gamal Abdel Nasser helped to broker the deal.

Terms
Although the text of the agreement was never published, an unofficial but probably-accurate text appeared in the Lebanese daily newspaper An-Nahar on 20 April 1970. The agreement established principles under which the presence and activities of Palestinian guerrillas in southeastern Lebanon would be tolerated and regulated by the Lebanese authorities.

Under the agreement, the 16 official UNRWA camps in Lebanon, home to 300,000 Palestinian refugees, were removed from the stern jurisdiction of the Lebanese Army's Deuxième Bureau and placed under the authority of the Palestinian Armed Struggle Command. Although the camps remained under Lebanese sovereignty, the new arrangements meant that after 1969, they became a key popular base for the guerrilla movement.

The agreement also established the right of the Palestinian residents in Lebanon "to join the Palestinian revolution through armed struggle". In addition, it also allowed the Palestinians legal control of their refugee camps in Lebanon and the launch of attacks against Israel from southern Lebanon. 

The Palestine Liberation Organization later effectively established a state within a state in Lebanon.

Lebanese Civil War
Palestinian involvement increased in Lebanon in the early 1970s, especially after Black September in Jordan. Eventually, the Lebanese Army became incapable of limiting the areas of PLO activity. In April 1975, the Lebanese Civil War broke out in Lebanon between the PLO and the Christians. Several months later the leftist Lebanese National Movement entered the conflict on the side of the PLO.

After the alliance's military successes the right-wing Maronite president, Suleiman Frangieh, called upon Syria to intervene. The PLO then retreated to the south but continued guerrilla operations across the Lebanon-Israel border, which resulted in an Israeli invasion in March 1978.

Escalations in the conflict led ultimately to the Israeli invasion and occupation of Lebanon in the 1982 Lebanon War, resulting in expulsion of the PLO from South Lebanon.

Annulment
In June 1987, Lebanese President Amine Gemayel signed a law to annul the Cairo Agreement with the PLO. The law was first drafted by Parliament Speaker Hussein el-Husseini and approved by the Lebanese Parliament on 21 May 1987, and signed by Prime Minister Salim El Hoss.

See also
 Taif Agreement

Notes

References
Cobban, Helena (1984). The Palestinian Liberation Organisation: People, Power, and Politics. Cambridge: Cambridge University Press. 
Federal Research Division (2004). Lebanon: A Country Study. Kessinger Publishing. 
Kushner, Harvey, W. (2003). Encyclopedia of Terrorism. Sage Publications. 
Roeder, Philip G. & Rothchild, Donald S. (2005). Sustainable Peace: Power and Democracy After Civil Wars. Cornell University Press. 
Rubenberg, Cheryl A. (1986). Israel and the American National Interest: A Critical Examination. University of Illinois Press. 
Solh, Raghid el- (2004). Lebanon and Arabism. I.B.Tauris. 
Weinberger, Naomi Joy (1986). Syrian Intervention in Lebanon: The 1975-76 Civil War. New York, NY: Oxford University Press. 
Weisburd, Arthur (1997). Use of Force: The Practice of States, 1945-1991. Penn State Press. 

Israeli–Palestinian conflict
1969 in Lebanon
Politics of Lebanon
1969 documents